A statue of Christopher Columbus is installed along Columbus Roundabout, in Guadalajara, in the Mexican state of Jalisco.

Description
The statue is supported by a large column. It formerly had a plaque that said "The discoverer of America".

Reception
Around 2008, the statue received unfavorable comments by indigenous groups as it is located in a zone where the statues of several American liberators are located.

See also

 List of monuments and memorials to Christopher Columbus

References

Monuments and memorials in Jalisco
Monuments and memorials to Christopher Columbus
Outdoor sculptures in Guadalajara
Sculptures of men in Mexico
Statues in Jalisco
Statues of Christopher Columbus